Felicola isidoroi, the Iberian lynx louse, was a species of trichodectid chewing louse.  It was known only from a single specimen, a male, and likely died out when the last survivors of its host species, the Iberian lynx, were taken into captivity and de-loused. The specimen was slightly larger than males of most of the remaining species within the subgenus Lorisicola. The female was never seen. The type specimen is in the collection of the Museo Nacional de Ciencias Naturales in Madrid.

See also
 Colpocephalum californici
 Conservation biology of parasites
 Conservation-induced extinction

References

Insects described in 2001
Lice
Ectoparasites
Parasitic arthropods of mammals
Extinct invertebrates since 1500
Species made extinct by human activities